Nam Hkam Hka is a dam in Burma. The project was initiated by the Chinese firm Yunnan Machinery & Equipment Import & Export Co. (YMEC).

References

Dams in Myanmar